The list of ship decommissionings in 1902 includes a chronological list of ships decommissioned in 1902.  In cases where no official decommissioning ceremony was held, the date of withdrawal from service may be used instead.  For ships lost at sea, see list of shipwrecks in 1902 instead.


References

See also 

1902
 Ship decommissionings
 Ship decommissionings
Ship decommissionings